Florian Boucansaud (born 15 February 1981 in Noisy-le-Sec) is a French retired professional football defender.

References

External links

1981 births
Living people
French footballers
Association football defenders
FC Gueugnon players
ES Troyes AC players
Stade Malherbe Caen players